No. 39 Wing RCAF was a unit of the Royal Canadian Air Force which served with the Royal Air Force in Europe during the Second World War.

History

No. 39 Wing was established on 12 September 1942 as an "Army Cooperation" Wing at Leatherhead, Surrey, England. It comprised No. 400 Squadron RCAF, No. 414 Squadron RCAF, and No. 430 Squadron RCAF. As a reconnaissance unit, its purpose was to gather photographic intelligence in support of allied ground operations.

The Wing left the UK and moved to the European continent on 2 July 1944 at Sommervieu, France. The Wing moved ever eastward following the front and finished the war at airfield B156 Luneburg, Germany where it was finally disbanded.

Aircraft
Tomahawk Mk.I (1942–1943)
Mustang Mk.I (1942–1945)
Spitfire LF Mk.IX (1944–1945)
Mosquito PR Mk.XVI (1943–1945)

Commanding Officers 
G/C D.M. Smith, 12 Sep 42 – 9 Feb 44
G/C E.H.G. Moncrieff AFC, 10 Feb 44 – 8 Feb 45
G/C G.H. Sellers, AFC, 9 Feb 45 – 15 May 45
G/C R.C.A. Waddell, DSO DFC, 16 May 45 – 7 Aug 45

See also

 List of Wings of the Royal Air Force

References

Citations

Units and formations of the Royal Canadian Air Force
RCAF 039
N
Military units and formations disestablished in 1945